Grandma's Pet is an animated short film by Walter Lantz Productions and as part of the Oswald the Lucky Rabbit series. It is the 53rd Lantz Oswald and the 106th overall.

Plot
One night, Oswald is reading to three kittens the story of Little Red Riding Hood. After reading his book, he falls to sleep in his bed.

Oswald then dreams of the live female stuffed doll (his second girlfriend in the series) being like the title character of the story he just read: walking through the woods in a red hood and carrying a basket. He even dreams of himself in the scene, accompanying her. On the way, they met a large wolf who desperately wants a share of the goods in the doll's basket. The doll, however, declines and tells the wolf that what's inside was for her grandmother. The wolf was disgusted and thinks of a way to obtain the contents.

As Oswald and the doll go on walking, the wolf decided to reach the grandmother's home before them which is part of his plan. The wolf invades the house and harasses the old lady before putting her in a freezer. He then disguises himself in a nightgown and tucks himself in the bed.

When the two little friends finally arrived at the house, the doll proceeds to the bedroom while Oswald stays near door. While the rabbit waits, a rat came to and tells him to open the freezer. Oswald opens it and was shocked to find the real grandmother trapped in a block of ice. At the bedroom, the doll eventually realizes who she's speaking to and begins to make her run as the wolf aggressively goes forth.

In no time, the wolf got his hands on the doll and takes her basket which he finds a magic wand inside. Before Oswald could intervene, he magically sends the rabbit into a skyscraper area, dangling on two clotheslines. The wolf then teleports Oswald onto an elevated railway with an incoming train, then into the mouth of a whale, and finally in a shooting gallery with firing shooters. He and the doll (still in his grasp) were in every place Oswald was transported to, but at safer locations.

Finding his way out of the shooters' gunfire, Oswald was able to take the wand, and teleports everybody back to the grandmother's place. When they returned to the house, the wolf, for some reason, was lying on a table unconscious. Oswald then uses the wand to transform their tormentor into a large roasted turkey. The grandmother, who is finally defrosted, came to the dining room and decides to have a meal of what's on the table. For a job well done, Oswald and the doll kissed each other.

Morning came and Oswald wakes up from his dream. He was, however, surprised to see that what he had been kissing was a cow which sticks its head in the window.

Availability
The cartoon is available on the Woody Woodpecker and Friends Classic Cartoon Collection DVD box set.

See also
Oswald the Lucky Rabbit filmography

References

External links
 Grandma's Pet at the Big Cartoon Database
 
 

1932 films
1932 animated films
1930s American animated films
1930s animated short films
American black-and-white films
Films about dreams
Films based on fairy tales
Films based on Little Red Riding Hood
Films directed by Walter Lantz
Oswald the Lucky Rabbit cartoons
Universal Pictures animated short films
Walter Lantz Productions shorts
Animated films about animals
Animated films about wolves